Windsor—Riverside was an electoral riding in Ontario, Canada. It was located in the east end of Windsor. The riding was created in 1975 out of Sandwich-Riverside and merged into Windsor—St. Clair and Windsor West in 1996 before the 1999 election.

Members of Provincial Parliament

Election results

  

Source: 

 
 

Source:

References

Former provincial electoral districts of Ontario